Running shorts are a specialized form of shorts worn by runners. Often the cut of a running short is quite short, this is done in order to maximise breathability and movement, and to ensure the pant does not catch on the runners knee.

Materials
Running shorts are designed to facilitate comfort and free movement during exercise. Their materials are lightweight and hard-wearing. Many running shorts include an inner lining that acts as underwear, so wearing separate underwear is not necessary. Polyester is a common fabric in running shorts and makes it comfortable.

Variants

Many running shorts have a seam cut up the side of each leg to enable freer movement. Manufacturers define running shorts according to the length of the leg which is not cut. For example, a 3/4 seam means that 1/4 of the length is cut.

 1/2 split seam shorts are the shortest.
 3/4 split seam shorts are short, but not as short as 1/2 split seam shorts.
 Square leg shorts have no split at all.

Longer shorts are not ideal for running. A runner's stride may pull up the shorts' fabric, which can cause discomfort. Nonetheless, some runners prefer longer shorts because they cover a greater portion of their legs.

Some runners use athletic hot pants as running shorts. Like 1/2 split seam shorts, hot pants do not encumber leg movement.

Lycra running shorts are an alternative to conventional, polyester-based shorts. In most cases, they  reach the mid-thigh. They are skin-tight, so they allow for more flexible, unencumbered movement.

See also
Gym shorts
Sportswear (activewear)

References

Trousers and shorts
Sport of athletics equipment